Masoud Ali Hanteh (born November 10, 1966) is a retired Iranian football player. He is currently free agent. His latest job was to be the manager of Esteghlal Ahvaz in Iran Pro League.

Playing career
He played for Aboomoslem back in 1980s, then joined Payam Mashhad for 1997–98 season before returning to F.C. Aboomoslem for 1998–99 season. He also represented Khorasan Provincial Team in the 1980s at senior and youth levels.

Managerial career
After retirement Hanteh coached Fajr Khorasan. He then coached a Khorasan League 2nd Division team Tarbiyat Khorasan and made the team promoted to 1st Division. He has been assistant coach at F.C. Aboomoslem for several years under Akbar Misaghian, Firouz Karimi and Farhad Kazemi.

References

External links
 Hanteh's biography on Abumoslem Club website
 ISNA

Iranian football managers
Iranian footballers
F.C. Aboomoslem players
Payam Mashhad players
Sportspeople from Mashhad
1966 births
Living people
Association football forwards